Fructose-bisphosphate aldolase, often just aldolase, is an enzyme catalyzing a reversible reaction that splits the aldol, fructose 1,6-bisphosphate, into the triose phosphates dihydroxyacetone phosphate (DHAP) and glyceraldehyde 3-phosphate (G3P). Aldolase can also produce DHAP from other (3S,4R)-ketose 1-phosphates such as fructose 1-phosphate and sedoheptulose 1,7-bisphosphate. Gluconeogenesis and the Calvin cycle, which are anabolic pathways,  use the reverse reaction. Glycolysis, a catabolic pathway, uses the forward reaction.  Aldolase is divided into two classes by mechanism.

The word aldolase also refers, more generally, to an enzyme that performs an aldol reaction (creating an aldol) or its reverse (cleaving an aldol), such as Sialic acid aldolase, which forms sialic acid. See the list of aldolases.

Mechanism and structure
Class I proteins form a protonated Schiff base intermediate linking a highly conserved active site lysine with the DHAP carbonyl carbon.  Additionally, tyrosine residues are crucial to this mechanism in acting as stabilizing hydrogen acceptors. Class II proteins use a different mechanism which polarizes the carbonyl group with a divalent cation like Zn2+. The Escherichia coli galactitol operon protein, gatY, and N-acetyl galactosamine operon protein, agaY, which are tagatose-bisphosphate aldolase, are homologs of class II fructose-bisphosphate aldolase. Two histidine residues in the first half of the sequence of these homologs have been shown to be involved in binding zinc.

The protein subunits of both classes each have an α/β domain folded into a TIM barrel containing the active site. Several subunits are assembled into the complete protein. The two classes share little sequence identity.

With few exceptions only class I proteins have been found in animals, plants, and green algae. With few exceptions only class II proteins have been found in fungi. Both classes have been found widely in other eukaryotes and in bacteria. The two classes are often present together in the same organism. Plants and algae have plastidal aldolase, sometimes a relic of endosymbiosis, in addition to the usual cytosolic aldolase. A bifunctional fructose-bisphosphate aldolase/phosphatase, with class I mechanism, has been found widely in archaea and in some bacteria. The active site of this archaeal aldolase is also in a TIM barrel.

In gluconeogenesis and glycolysis
Gluconeogenesis and glycolysis share a series of six reversible reactions. In gluconeogenesis glyceraldehyde-3-phosphate is reduced to fructose 1,6-bisphosphate with aldolase. In glycolysis fructose 1,6-bisphosphate is made into glyceraldehyde-3-phosphate and dihydroxyacetone phosphate through the use of aldolase. The aldolase used in gluconeogenesis and glycolysis is a cytoplasmic protein.

Three forms of class I protein are found in vertebrates.
Aldolase A is preferentially expressed in muscle and brain; aldolase B in liver, kidney, and in enterocytes; and aldolase C in brain. Aldolases A and C are mainly involved in glycolysis, while aldolase B is involved in both glycolysis and gluconeogenesis. Some defects in aldolase B cause hereditary fructose intolerance. The metabolism of free fructose in liver exploits the ability of aldolase B to use fructose 1-phosphate as a substrate. Archaeal fructose-bisphosphate aldolase/phosphatase is presumably involved in gluconeogenesis because its product is fructose 6-phosphate.

In the Calvin cycle
The Calvin cycle is a carbon fixation pathway; it is part of photosynthesis, which convert carbon dioxide and other compounds into glucose. It and gluconeogenesis share a series of four reversible reactions. In both pathways 3-phosphoglycerate (3-PGA or 3-PG) is reduced to fructose 1,6-bisphosphate with aldolase catalyzing the last reaction. A fifth reaction, catalyzed in both pathways by fructose 1,6-bisphosphatase, hydrolyzes the fructose 1-6-bisphosphate to fructose 6-phosphate and inorganic phosphate. The large decrease in free energy makes this reaction irreversible. In the Calvin cycle aldolase also catalyzes the production of sedoheptulose 1,7-bisphosphate from DHAP and erythrose 4-phosphate. The chief products of the Calvin cycle are triose phosphate (TP), which is a mixture of DHAP and G3P, and fructose 6-phosphate. Both are also needed to regenerate RuBP. The aldolase used by plants and algae in the Calvin cycle is usually a plastid-targeted protein encoded by a nuclear gene.

Reactions
Aldolase catalyzes
fructose 1,6-bisphosphate  DHAP + G3P

and also
sedoheptulose 1,7-bisphosphate  DHAP + erythrose 4-phosphate
fructose 1-phosphate  DHAP + glyceraldehyde

Aldolase is used in the reversible trunk of gluconeogenesis/glycolysis
2(PEP + NADH + H+ + ATP + H2O)  fructose 1,6-bisphosphate + 2(NAD+ + ADP + Pi)

Aldolase is also used in the part of the Calvin cycle shared with gluconeogenesis, with the irreversible phosphate hydrolysis at the end catalyzed by fructose 1,6-bisphosphatase
2(3-PG + NADPH + H+ + ATP + H2O)  fructose 1,6-bisphosphate + 2(NADP+ + ADP + Pi)
fructose 1,6-bisphosphate + H2O → fructose 6-phosphate + Pi

In gluconeogenesis 3-PG is produced by enolase and phosphoglycerate mutase acting in series
PEP + H2O  2-PG  3-PG

In the Calvin cycle 3-PG is produced by RuBisCO
RuBP + CO2 + H2O → 2(3-PG)

G3P is produced by phosphoglycerate kinase acting in series with glyceraldehyde-3-phosphate dehydrogenase (GAPDH) in gluconeogenesis, and in series with glyceraldehyde-3-phosphate dehydrogenase (NADP+) (phosphorylating) in the Calvin cycle
3-PG + ATP  1,3-bisphosphoglycerate + ADP
1,3-bisphosphoglycerate + NAD(P)H + H+  G3P + Pi + NAD(P)+

Triose-phosphate isomerase maintains DHAP and G3P in near equilibrium, producing the mixture called triose phosphate (TP)
G3P  DHAP

Thus both DHAP and G3P are available to aldolase.

Moonlighting properties

Aldolase has also been implicated in many "moonlighting" or non-catalytic functions, based upon its binding affinity for many other proteins including F-actin, α-tubulin, light chain dynein, WASP, Band 3 anion exchanger, phospholipase D (PLD2), glucose transporter GLUT4, inositol trisphosphate, V-ATPase and ARNO (a guanine nucleotide exchange factor of ARF6).  These associations are thought to be predominantly involved in cellular structure, however, involvement in endocytosis, parasite invasion, cytoskeleton rearrangement, cell motility, membrane protein trafficking and recycling, signal transduction and tissue compartmentalization have been explored.

References

Further reading

External links

 Tolan Laboratory at Boston University

Protein domains
Lyases
Moonlighting proteins
Glycolysis enzymes
Glycolysis